The Tempio Ossario ai Caduti d'Italia  is a church built in 1931 in Udine, in north-eastern Italy. The architects who realised the project are Limongelli and Gino Valle.

Description
In front of the facade there are four sculptures: a member in the service of the navy, one of the air force, one of the army and one of the Alpini. The remains of 25,000 Italian soldiers who died during the First World War are buried in the walls of the church's chapels and in the crypt, which is the biggest in Italy.

Sources
 Official website

External links
 

Buildings and structures in Udine
Churches in Friuli-Venezia Giulia
Buildings and structures completed in 1931
Churches completed in 1931